is a station on the Tama Toshi Monorail Line in Tachikawa, Tokyo, Japan.

Lines
Shibasaki-Taiikukan Station is a station on the Tama Toshi Monorail Line and is located 6.5 kilometers from the terminus of the line at Kamikitadai Station.

Station layout
Shibasaki-Taiikukan Station is a raised station with two tracks and two opposed side platforms, with the station building located underneath. It is a standardized station building for this monorail line.

Platforms

History
The station opened on 10 January 2000.

Station numbering was introduced in February 2018 with Shibasaki-Taiikukan being assigned TT10.

Surrounding area
The station is above Tokyo Metropolitan Route 149. Tachikawa Municipal Shibasaki Gymnasium is nearby, as is the Tama River.

References

External links

 Tama Monorail Shibasaki-Taiikukan Station 

Railway stations in Japan opened in 2000
Railway stations in Tokyo
Tama Toshi Monorail
Tachikawa, Tokyo